The Lord of the Sabbath is an expression describing Jesus which appears in all three Synoptic Gospels: Matthew 12:1–8, Mark 2:23–28 and Luke 6:1–5. These sections each relate an encounter between Jesus, his Apostles and the Pharisees, the first of the four "Sabbath controversies".

According to the Gospel of Mark:

Some versions of the Gospel of Luke provide a specific date for the incident – the second Sabbath after the first (likely to mean the Sabbaths counted from the Feast of First Fruits in accordance with Leviticus 23).

The Gospel of Matthew only provides an additional example to justify working on the Sabbath as "a second example, if the first does not convince you": "Or haven't you read in the Law that the priests on Sabbath duty in the temple desecrate the Sabbath and yet are innocent?".

Lutheran theologian Johann Albrecht Bengel suggested that this dialogue could have taken place at the time of year when the regulations on temple sacrifices in the Book of Leviticus were being read during Sabbath services; however, the Pulpit Commentary questions this by reference to a "double uncertainty: first, what time of year it really was; and secondly, what is the antiquity of the present custom of reading the whole Law every year?"

Matthew makes two statements regarding Jesus' view of his role: he is Lord [even] of the Sabbath and also he is "one greater than the Temple". There are different interpretations of the reference to the Son of man statement in Matthew 12:1–8 that "the Son of man is Lord of the Sabbath". It may mean that Jesus is claiming to be the Lord or that his Apostles are entitled to do as they wish on the Sabbath.

Notes

See also

 Mark 2
 Gospel harmony
 Son of man (Christianity)
 Calling of Matthew
 Biblical Sabbath
 Biblical law in Christianity

Doctrines and teachings of Jesus
Christian terminology
Sayings of Jesus
Biblical phrases